Ronald Rael (born 1971, Conejos County, Colorado) is an American artist known for architecture and 3D printing. He attended University of Colorado Boulder and Columbia University.  He collaborates with Virginia San Fratello under the name Rael San Fratello. In 2014 Rael San Fratello received the Emerging Voices award from the Architectural League of New York. Rael San Fratello operate the venture Emerging Objects which develops 3D printed objects.

His collaborative work is in the collection of the Museum of Modern Art, and the San Francisco Museum of Modern Art. Their series, Bad Ombres v.2, was acquired by the Smithsonian American Art Museum as part of the Renwick Gallery's 50th Anniversary Campaign.

Rael is the author of several books including Printing Architecture: Innovative Recipes for 3D Printing (Princeton Architectural Press, 2018) and Earth Architecture (Princeton Architectural Press, 2008). He presented a TED talk on Borderwall as Architecture.

References

1971 births
Living people
Architects from Colorado